This is a list of current honorary Knights and Dames of the Order of St Michael and St George.

Honorary Knights/Dame Grand Cross (GCMG)

Honorary Knights/Dames Commander (KCMG/DCMG)

References

current